António Eleutério dos Santos (born 10 February 1928) simply Eleutério, is a former Portuguese footballer who played as a midfielder.

External links 
 
 

1928 births
Living people
Portuguese footballers
Association football midfielders
Primeira Liga players
FC Porto players
Portugal international footballers